Kyrgyz National Agrarian University is a public university in Bishkek, the capital of Kyrgyzstan. It is named after K. I. Skryabin. 

KNAU was established in 1933 by then Soviet constituent Kirghiz SSR with its first admission of 53 students. 

Now more than 7,000 students study at KNAU in 7 faculties and 31 specializations. The instruction is provided in Russian by 287 professors including 93 holding PhDs. As of 2022, the current rector of the university is  Professor R. Z. Nurgaziev.

References

External links

Universities in Kyrgyzstan
Educational institutions established in 1933
1933 establishments in the Soviet Union